Deh Kabud and Deh-e Kabud (meaning "blue/gray village") may refer to:
 Deh-e Kabud, Hamadan
 Deh-e Kabud, Kermanshah
 Deh Kabud, Lorestan